Alan Rechuldak Seid (born June 9, 1957) is a Palauan businessman and politician of partially American Jewish origin. He was elected into House of Delegates of Palau from 1989 until 2000. He along with Chen Ding-nan agreed to build the Palasia Hotel in 1995.  He was a senator in the Senate of Palau from 2005 to 2009 In the 2008 presidential election he was the running mate of Elias Camsek Chin.

He ran for president in the 2020 presidential elections.

References

Notes
Biography at senate website

1957 births
Living people
Members of the Senate of Palau
People from Koror
Palauan businesspeople